A multinational corporation (MNC), also referred to as a multinational enterprise (MNE), a transnational enterprise (TNE), a transnational corporation (TNC), an international corporation or a stateless corporation with subtle but contrasting senses, is a corporate organization that owns and controls the production of goods or services in at least one country other than its home country. Control is considered an important aspect of an MNC, to distinguish it from international portfolio investment organizations, such as some international mutual funds that invest in corporations abroad simply to diversify financial risks. Black's Law Dictionary suggests that a company or group should be considered a multinational corporation "if it derives 25% or more of its revenue from out-of-home-country operations".

Most of the largest and most influential companies of the modern age are publicly traded multinational corporations, including Forbes Global 2000 companies.

History

Colonialism
The history of multinational corporations began with the history of colonialism. The first multinational corporations were founded to build set up colonial "factories" or port cities. In addition to carrying on trade between the mother country and the colonies, the British East India Company became a quasi-government in its own right, with local government officials and its own army in India . The two main examples were the British East India Company, and the Dutch East India Company (VOC). Others included the Swedish Africa Company, and the Hudson's Bay Company.  These early corporations engaged in international trade and exploration, and set up trading posts.

The Dutch government took over the VOC in 1799 and during the 19th century, other governments increasingly took over the private companies, most notable in British India. During the process of decolonization, the European colonial charter companies were disbanded, with the final colonial corporation, the Mozambique Company, dissolving in 1972.

Mining
Mining of gold, silver, copper, and oil was a major activity early on and remains so today. International mining companies became prominent in Britain in the 19th century, such as the Rio Tinto company founded in 1873, which started with the purchase of sulfur and copper mines from the Spanish government. Rio Tinto, now based in London and Melbourne Australia, has made many acquisitions and expanded globally to mine aluminum, iron ore, copper, uranium, and diamonds. European mines in South Africa began opening in the late 19th century, producing gold and other minerals for the world market, jobs for locals, and business and profits for companies. Cecil Rhodes (1853–1902) was one of the few businessmen in the era who became Prime Minister (of South Africa 1890–1896). His mining enterprises included the British South Africa Company and De Beers. The latter company practically controlled the global diamond market from his base in southern Africa.

Oil

The "Seven Sisters" was a common term for the seven multinational companies which dominated the global petroleum industry from the mid-1940s to the mid-1970s.
Anglo-Iranian Oil Company (originally Anglo-Persian; now BP)
Royal Dutch Shell
Standard Oil Company of California (SoCal, later Chevron)
Gulf Oil (now merged into Chevron)
Texaco (now merged into Chevron)
Standard Oil Company of New Jersey (Esso, later Exxon, now part of ExxonMobil)
Standard Oil Company of New York (Socony, later Mobil, now part of ExxonMobil)

Preceding the 1973 oil crisis, the Seven Sisters controlled around 85 percent of the world's petroleum reserves. In the 1970s most countries with large reserves nationalized their reserves that had been owned by major oil companies. Since then, industry dominance has shifted to the OPEC cartel and state-owned oil and gas companies, such as Saudi Aramco, Gazprom (Russia), China National Petroleum Corporation, National Iranian Oil Company, PDVSA (Venezuela), Petrobras (Brazil), and Petronas (Malaysia). By 2012 only 7% of the world's known oil reserves were in countries that allowed private international companies free rein. Fully 65% were in the hands of state-owned companies that operated in one country and sold oil to multinationals such as BP, Shell, ExxonMobil and Chevron.

Manufacturing
Down through the 1930s about 4/5 of the international investments by the multinational corporations was concentrated in the primary sector, especially mining (especially oil) and agriculture (rubber, tobacco, sugar, palm oil, coffee, cocoa, tropical fruits). Most went to the Third World colonies. That changed dramatically after 1945 as the investors turn to industrialized countries, and invested in manufacturing (especially high-tech electronics, chemicals, drugs and vehicles) as well as trade.

Sweden's leading manufacturing concern was SKF, a leading maker of bearings for machinery. In order to expand its international business, it decided in 1966 it needed to use the English language. Senior officials, although mostly still Swedish, all learned English in all major internal documents were in English, the lingua franca of multinational corporations.

Unilever

A prominent multinational manufacturer is Unilever, a consumer goods company headquartered in London. Its products include many foods, as well as vitamins, supplements, tea, coffee, cleaning agents, water and air purifiers, pet food, and cosmetics. Unilever is the largest producer of soap in the world. Unilever's products are sold in 190 countries.

Unilever owns over 400 brands, with a turnover in 2020 of 51 billion euros. The company is organized into three main divisions: Foods and Refreshments; Home Care; and Beauty & Personal Care. It has research and development facilities in China, India, the Netherlands, the United Kingdom, and the United States.

Unilever was founded in 1929 by the merger of a Dutch margarine producer Margarine Unie and the British soap maker Lever Brothers. After 1950, it increasingly diversified its products and expanded its operations worldwide. Its numerous acquisitions included Lipton (1971), Brooke Bond (1984), Chesebrough-Ponds (1987), Best Foods (2000), Ben & Jerry's (2000), Alberto-Culver (2010), Dollar Shave Club (2016) and Pukka Herbs (2017).

Post second world war
After the war, the number of businesses having at least one foreign country operation rose drastically from a few thousand to 78,411 in 2007. Meanwhile, 74% of parent companies are located in economically advanced countries. Developing and former communist countries such as China, India, and Brazil being the largest receipients. However, 70% of foreign direct investment went into developed countries in the form os stocks and cash flows. The rise of the number of multinational companies could be due to a stable political environment that encourages cooperation, advances in technology that enables management of faraway regions, and favorable organizational development that encourages business expansion into other countries.

Current status 

A multinational corporation (MNC) is usually a large corporation incorporated in one country which produces or sells goods or services in various countries. Two common characteristics shared by MNCs are their large size and centrally controlled worldwide activities.
 Importing and exporting goods and services
 Making significant investments in a foreign country
 Buying and selling licenses in foreign markets
 Engaging in contract manufacturing — permitting a local manufacturer in a foreign country to produce its products
 Opening manufacturing facilities or assembly operations in foreign countries

MNCs may gain from their global presence in a variety of ways. First of all, MNCs can benefit from the economy of scale by spreading R&D expenditures and advertising costs over their global sales, pooling global purchasing power over suppliers, and utilizing their technological and managerial experience globally with minimal additional costs. Furthermore, MNCs can use their global presence to take advantage of underpriced labor services available in certain developing countries, and gain access to special R&D capabilities residing in advanced foreign countries.

The problem of moral and legal constraints upon the behavior of multinational corporations, given that they are effectively "stateless" actors, is one of several urgent global socioeconomic problems that has emerged during the late twentieth century.

Potentially, the best concept for analyzing society's governance limitations over modern corporations is the concept of "stateless corporations". Coined at least as early as 1991 in Business Week, the conception was theoretically clarified in 1993: that an empirical strategy for defining a stateless corporation is with analytical tools at the intersection between demographic analysis and transportation research. This intersection is known as logistics management, and it describes the importance of rapidly increasing global mobility of resources. In a long history of analysis of multinational corporations, we are some quarter-century into an era of stateless corporations - corporations that meet the realities of the needs of source materials on a worldwide basis and to produce and customize products for individual countries.

One of the first multinational business organizations, the East India Company, was established in 1601. After the East India Company, came the Dutch East India Company, founded on March 20, 1603, which would become the largest company in the world for nearly 200 years.

The main characteristics of multinational companies are:
 In general, there is a national strength of large companies as the main body, in the way of foreign direct investment or acquiring local enterprises, established subsidiaries or branches in many countries;
 It usually has a complete decision-making system and the highest decision-making center, each subsidiary or branch has its own decision-making body, according to its different features and operations to make decisions, but its decision must be subordinated to the highest decision-making centre;
 MNCs seek markets in worldwide and rational production layout, professional fixed-point production, and fixed-point sales products, in order to achieve maximum profit;
 Due to strong economic and technical strength, with fast information transmission, as well as funding for rapid cross-border transfers, the multinational has stronger competitiveness in the world;
 Many large multinational companies have varying degrees of monopoly in some area, due to economic and technical strength or production advantages.

Foreign direct investment 

When a corporation invests in a country which it is not domiciled, it is called foreign direct investment (FDI). Countries may place restrictions on direct investment; for example, China has historically required partnerships with local firms or special approval for certain types of investments by foreigners, although some of these restrictions were eased in 2019. Similarly, the United States Committee on Foreign Investment in the United States scrutinizes foreign investments.

In addition, corporations may be prohibited from various business transactions by international sanctions or domestic laws. For example, Chinese domestic corporations or citizens have limitations on their ability to make foreign investments outside of China, in part to reduce capital outflow. Countries can impose extraterritorial sanctions on foreign corporations even for doing business with other foreign corporations, which occurred in 2019 with the United States sanctions against Iran; European companies faced with the possibility of losing access to the U.S. market by trading with Iran.

International investment agreements also facilitate direct investment between two countries, such as the North American Free Trade Agreement and most favored nation status.

Legal domicile 
Raymond Vernon reported in 1977 that of the largest multinationals focused on manufacturing, 250 were headquartered in the United States, 115 in Western Europe, 70 in Japan, and 20 in the rest of the world. The multinationals in banking numbered 20 headquartered in the United States, 13 in Europe, nine in Japan and three in Canada. Today multinationals can select from a variety of jurisdictions for various subsidiaries, but the ultimate parent company can select a single legal domicile; The Economist suggests that the Netherlands has become a popular choice, as its company laws have fewer requirements for meetings, compensation, and audit committees, and Great Britain had advantages due to laws on withholding dividends and a double-taxation treaty with the United States.

Corporations can legally engage in tax avoidance through their choice of jurisdiction, but must be careful to avoid illegal tax evasion.

Stateless or transnational 

Corporations that are broadly active across the world without a concentration in one area have been called stateless or "transnational" (although "transnational corporation" is also used synonymously with "multinational corporation"), but as of 1992, a corporation must be legally domiciled in a particular country and engage in other countries through foreign direct investment and the creation of foreign subsidiaries. Geographic diversification can be measured across various domains, including ownership and control, workforce, sales, and regulation and taxation.

Regulation and taxation 

Multinational corporations may be subject to the laws and regulations of both their domicile and the additional jurisdictions where they are engaged in business. In some cases, the jurisdiction can help to avoid burdensome laws, but regulatory statutes often target the "enterprise" with statutory language around "control".

, the United States and most OECD countries have the legal authority to tax a domiciled parent corporation on its worldwide revenue, including subsidiaries. , the U.S. applies its corporate taxation "extraterritorially", which has motivated tax inversions to change the home state. By 2019, most OECD nations, with the notable exception of the U.S., had moved to territorial tax in which only revenue inside the border was taxed; however, these nations typically scrutinize foreign income with controlled foreign corporation (CFC) rules to avoid base erosion and profit shifting.

In practice, even under an extraterritorial system, taxes may be deferred until remittance, with possible repatriation tax holidays, and subject to foreign tax credits. Countries generally cannot tax the worldwide revenue of a foreign subsidiary, and taxation is complicated by transfer pricing arrangements with parent corporations.

Alternatives and arrangements 
For small corporations, registering a foreign subsidiary can be expensive and complex, involving fees, signatures, and forms; a professional employer organization (PEO) is sometimes advertised as a cheaper and simpler alternative, but not all jurisdictions have laws accepting these types of arrangements.

Dispute resolution and arbitration 

Disputes between corporations in different nations is often handled through international arbitration.

Theoretical background
The actions of multinational corporations are strongly supported by economic liberalism and free market system in a globalized international society. According to the economic realist view, individuals act in rational ways to maximize their self-interest and therefore, when individuals act rationally, markets are created and they function best in a free market system where there is little government interference. As a result, international wealth is maximized with free exchange of goods and services.

To many economic liberals, multinational corporations are the vanguard of the liberal order. They are the embodiment par excellence of the liberal ideal of an interdependent world economy. They have taken the integration of national economies beyond trade and money to the internationalization of production. For the first time in history, production, marketing, and investment are being organized on a global scale rather than in terms of isolated national economies.

International business is also a specialist field of academic research. Economic theories of the multinational corporation include internalization theory and the eclectic paradigm. The latter is also known as the OLI framework.

The other theoretical dimension of the role of multinational corporations concerns the relationship between the globalization of economic engagement and the culture of national and local responses. This has a history of self-conscious cultural management going back at least to the 60s. For example:

Multinational enterprise 
"Multinational enterprise" (MNE) is the term used by international economist and similarly defined with the multinational corporation (MNC) as an enterprise that controls and manages production establishments, known as plants located in at least two countries. The multinational enterprise (MNE) will engage in foreign direct investment (FDI) as the firm makes direct investments in host country plants for equity ownership and managerial control to avoid some transaction costs.

Criticism

Sanjaya Lall in 1974 proposed a spectrum of scholarly analysis of multinational corporations, from the political right to the left. He put the business school how-to-do-it writers at the extreme right, followed by the liberal laissez-faire economists, and the neoliberals (they remain right of center but do allow for occasional mistakes of the marketplace such as externalities). Moving to the left side of the line are nationalists, who prioritize national interests over corporate profits, then the "dependencia" school in Latin America that focuses on the evils of imperialism, and on the far left the Marxists. The range is so broad that scholarly consensus is hard to discern.

Anti-corporate advocates criticize multinational corporations for being without a basis in a national ethos, being ultimate without a specific nationhood, and that this lack of an ethos appears in their ways of operating as they enter into contracts with countries that have low human rights or environmental standards. In the world economy facilitated by multinational corporations, capital will increasingly be able to play workers, communities, and nations off against one another as they demand tax, regulation and wage concessions while threatening to move. In other words, increased mobility of multinational corporations benefits capital while workers and communities lose. Some negative outcomes generated by multinational corporations include increased inequality, unemployment, and wage stagnation. For the debate from a neo-liberal perspective see Raymond Vernon, Storm over the Multinationals (1977).</ref>

The aggressive use of tax avoidance schemes, and multinational tax havens, allows multinational corporations to gain competitive advantages over small and medium-sized enterprises. Organizations such as the Tax Justice Network criticize governments for allowing multinational organizations to escape tax, particularly by using base erosion and profit shifting (BEPS) tax tools, since less money can be spent for public services.

See also

 
 Globalization
 Global workforce
 List of multinational corporations
 Transnational Corporations Observatory
 World economy
 Multinational tax haven

Notes

References

Further reading
 Cameron, Rondo, V. I. Bovykin, et al. eds. International banking, 1870–1914 (1991)
 Chandler, Alfred D. and Bruce Mazlish, eds. Leviathans: Multinational Corporations and the New Global History (2005). online
 Chandler, Alfred D. et al. eds. Big Business and the Wealth of Nations (Cambridge University Press, 1999) excerpt
 Chernow, Ron. The House of Morgan: An American Banking Dynasty and the Rise of Modern Finance (2010) excerpt
 Davenport-Hines, R. P. T., and Geoffrey Jones, eds. British Business in Asia since 1860 (2003) excerpt
 Dunning. John H. and Sarianna M. Lundan. Multinational Enterprises and the Global Economy (2nd ed. 2008), major textbook 1993 edition online
 Habib-Mintz, Nazia. "Multinational corporations’ role in improving labour standards in developing countries." Journal of International Business and Economy 10.2 (2009): 1–20. online
 Hunt, Michael H. "Americans in the China Market: Economic Opportunities and Economic Nationalism, 1890s–1931." Business History Review 51.3 (1977): 277–307. online
 Jones, Geoffrey. Multinationals and Global Capitalism: From the Nineteenth to the Twenty-first Century (2005) 
 Jones, Geoffrey. Merchants to multinationals : British trading companies in the nineteenth and twentieth centuries (2000) online
 Jones, Geoffrey, and Jonathan Zeitlin, eds. The Oxford Handbook of Business History (2008)
 Jones, Geoffrey, et al. The History of the British Bank of the Middle East: Vol. 2, Banking and Oil (1987) 
 Jones, Geoffrey. The Evolution of International Business (1995) online
 Lumby, Anthony. "Economic history and theories of the multinational corporation." South African journal of economic history 3.2 (1988): 104–124.
 Martin, Lisa, ed. The Oxford Handbook of the Political Economy of International Trade (2015) excerpt
 Munjal, Surender, Pawan Budhwar, and Vijay Pereira. "A perspective on multinational enterprise’s national identity dilemma." Social Identities 24.5 (2018): 548–563. online
 Stopford, John M. "The origins of British-based multinational manufacturing enterprises." Business History Review 48.3 (1974): 303–335.
 Tugendhat, Christopher. The multinationals (Penguin, 1973) online.
 Vernon, Raymond. Storm over the Multinationals: The Real Issues (Harvard UP, 1977). online
 Wells, Louis T. Third world multinationals: The rise of foreign investments from developing countries (MIT Press, 1983) on companies based in Third World
 Wilkins, Mira. "The history of multinational enterprise." in The Oxford handbook of international business vol 2 (2009). online
 Wilkins, Mira. The Emergence of Multinational Enterprise: American Business Abroad from the Colonial Era to 1914 (1970)
 Wilkins, Mira. Maturing of Multinational Enterprise : American Business Abroad from 1914 to 1970 (1974)
 Wilkins, Mira. American business abroad: Ford on six continents (1964) online

Corporate histories

 Ciafone, Amanda. Counter-Cola: A Multinational History of the Global Corporation (U of California Press, 2019) on Coca-Cola.
 Fritz, Martin and Karlsson, Birgit. SKF: A Global Story, 1907–2007 (2006). ISBN 978-91-7736-576-1
 Scheiber, Harry N. "World War I as Entrepreneurial Opportunity: Willard Straight and the American International Corporation." Political Science Quarterly 84.3 (1969): 486–511. online

Historiography
 Hernes, Helga. The Multinational Corporation: A Guide to Information Sources (Gale, 1977). online

External links

 Data on transnational corporations
 UNCTAD publications on multinational corporations

International business
Multinational companies
Transnationalism
Economic globalization